The Duru languages are a group of Savanna languages spoken in northern Cameroon and eastern Nigeria. They were labeled "G4" in Joseph Greenberg's Adamawa language-family proposal.

Kleinewillinghöfer (2012) also observes many morphological similarities between the Samba-Duru and Central Gur languages.

Languages
Duli (extinct)
Dii: Duupa, Dugun (Panõ), Dii (Mambe’, Mamna’a, Goom, Boow, Ngbang, Sagzee, Vaazin, Home, Nyok)
Peere (Kutin)
Longto (Voko)
Vere–Dowayo
Dowayo
Sewe
Koma
Vere

However, Guldemann (2018) casts doubt on the coherence of Samba–Duru as a unified group.

Classification
In the Adamawa Languages Project site, Kleinewillinghöfer (2015) classifies the Samba-Duru group as follows (see also Leko languages).

Samba-Duru
Vere (Verre)
Jango (Mom Jango)
Vere cluster (Momi, Vere Kaadam)
Wɔmmu (Wongi, Wɔŋgi)
Nissim-Eilim
Kobom, Karum (Vere Kari), Danum
Vɔmnəm (Koma Vomni)
Gəunəm cluster: Yarəm, Lim, Gbaŋrɨm, Baidəm, Zanəm, Ləələm, etc.
Damtəm (Koma Damti), etc.
Gəmme (Gimme) (Koma)
Gəmnəm (Gəmnime, Gimnime): Beiya, Gindoo; Riitime
Gəmme (Kompana, Panme): Yəgme, Dehnime; Baanime
Doyayo (Dooya̰a̰yɔ): Markɛ; Tɛ̰ɛ̰rɛ (of Poli); Tɛ̰ɛ̰rɛ (of the mountains)
Duru
Dii cluster
Dugun (Paape, Sa)
Duupa (Paape)
Pɛrɛ (Pere, Kutin): Gaziwaːlɛ, Nɔlti), ˀAːlti; Zɔŋ Pɛrɛ (Potopo)
Lɔŋto (Voko, Woko)
Samba (Samba Leeko, Leko)
Samba cluster
Mubaako (Məbaako, Mumbaako, Nyong)
Kolbila
Pɛrɛma (Wom)

Names and locations
Below is a list of language names, populations, and locations from Blench (2019).

Footnotes

References
Roger Blench, 2004. List of Adamawa languages (ms)

External links
Samba-Duru (Adamawa Languages Project)

 
Leko–Nimbari languages
Languages of Nigeria
Languages of Cameroon